Oandu may refer to:

Geography 
 Oandu, Ida-Viru County, village in Maidla Parish, Ida-Viru County, Estonia
 Oandu, Lääne-Viru County, village in Vihula Parish, Lääne-Viru County, Estonia